Jack Fier (November 8, 1896 – March 3, 1966) was an American film producer. He worked on more than 140 films between 1938 and 1965.

Selected filmography

 The Secret of Treasure Island (1938)
 The Great Adventures of Wild Bill Hickok (1938)
 The Spider's Web (1938)
 Smashing the Spy Ring (1938)
 Flying G-Men (1939)
 Mandrake the Magician (1939)
 Overland with Kit Carson (1939)
 Cafe Hostess (1940)
 Nobody's Children (1940)
 Sweetheart of the Campus (1941)
 The Pinto Kid (1941)
 The Blonde from Singapore (1941)
 Secrets of the Lone Wolf (1941)
 Stand By All Networks (1942)
 Frontier Fury (1943)
 Doughboys in Ireland (1943)
 Sergeant Mike (1944)

References

External links

1896 births
1966 deaths
Film producers from New York (state)
People from Brooklyn